Cebrián is a Spanish surname, derived from the medieval given name Cebrián (from the Latin Cyprianus, which was originally given to people from Cyprus). Notable people with the surname include:

David Cebrián (born 1991), Spanish racing driver
Elisabeth Cebrián (born 1971), Spanish former basketball player
Juan Luis Cebrián (born 1944), Spanish journalist and businessman
Mercedes Cebrián (born 1971), Spanish writer and translator
Pedro Cebrián, 5th Count of Fuenclara (1687–1752), Spanish diplomat and viceroy of New Spain

References

Spanish-language surnames